Mess of Blues  is an album by Jeff Healey. It was released in March 2008, less than two weeks after Healey's death. Four of the album's tracks were recorded live in front of audiences, two of the live tracks at the Islington Academy in London, and the other two live tracks at Jeff Healey's Roadhouse in Toronto. The other six tracks were recorded at Studio 92 in Canada by Norm Barker and Richard Uglow. The whole album features the band which normally accompanied Jeff at his club, Jeff Healey's Roadhouse. The song "Mess of Blues", which appears on the album was written by Doc Pomus and Mort Shuman and was originally recorded by Elvis Presley.

Track listing 

 "I'm Tore Down" – 5:23
 "How Blue Can You Get" – 8:54
 "Sugar Sweet" – 3:46
 "Jambalaya (On the Bayou)" – 4:00
 "The Weight" – 4:26
 "Mess O' Blues" – 3:24
 "It's Only Money" – 3:10
 "Like a Hurricane" – 6:39
 "Sitting on Top of the World" – 7:07
 "Shake, Rattle and Roll" – 4:29

Personnel 

Jeff Healey – Vocals, Guitar
Al Webster – Drums
Alec Fraser – Acoustic Guitar, Bass Guitar
Dan Noordermeer – Vocals, Guitar
Dave Murphy – Keyboards
Holger Peterson – Background Vocals

References 
 http://ninebullets.net/archives/jeff-healey-mess-of-blues
 http://www.cduniverse.com/productinfo.asp?pid=7637583

2008 albums
Jeff Healey albums
Albums published posthumously